Olympique Lyonnais is a French professional association football club based in Lyon, Rhône-Alpes, playing in Ligue 1, the top level of the French football league system, as of the 2010–11 season. The club was formed in 1899 as the football section of sports club Lyon Olympique Universitaire. In 1950, the section split from the club and formed the club that exists today. Lyon played their first competitive match in August 1950. The club's first major honor was winning the 1963–64 edition of the Coupe de France. Lyon won their first ever Ligue 1 title in the 2001–02 season. The title started a national record-breaking streak of seven successive league championships.
Since playing their first competitive match, more than 500 players have made a competitive first-team appearance for the club.

Olympique Lyonnais' record appearance-maker is Serge Chiesa, who made 542 total competitive appearances between 1969–1983. In 1981, Chiesa surpassed Fleury Di Nallo who was the first player in the club's history to make 400 competitive appearances. Di Nallo is the club's all-time leading goalscorer with 222 and finished his career at Lyon with 495 total appearances. Only six other players have made over 400 appearances for Lyon. Goalkeepers Grégory Coupet and Yves Chauveau made 519 and 490 competitive appearances, respectively, while Sidney Govou appeared in 412. Coupet and Govou, alongside Juninho Pernambucano, are the only players to have played on all seven of the club's league-winning championship teams. Aimé Mignot is the defender with the most appearances for the club with 424 caps. Anthony Réveillère rounds out the list having made exactly 400 appearances for Lyon. Portuguese international Anthony Lopes is currently the only active player with more than 400 appearances for the club.

Players with 300 or more appearances 
 Appearances and goals are for first-team competitive matches only, including Ligue 1, Ligue 2, Coupe de France, Coupe de la Ligue, Trophée des Champions, European Cup/Champions League, UEFA Cup/Europa League, Cup Winners' Cup, Inter-Cities Fairs Cup, UEFA Super Cup and Club World Cup matches. Statistics correct as of 17 March 2023. Players marked in bold are still playing for the club.

Position key:
GK – Goalkeeper;
DF – Defender;
MF – Midfielder;
FW – Forward

Players with 200 or more appearances

Players with 100 or more appearances

Players with 50 or more appearances

Notes

References

 
Players
Lyon
Association football player non-biographical articles